Roys of Wroxham is a family owned group of general stores based in Hoveton, Norfolk. The store after winning a competition in the early 1930s uses the motto "The World's Largest Village Store" in all its advertising and literature.

History

Roys was founded in 1895 when brothers Alfred and Arnold Roy opened their general store in the village of Coltishall. In 1899, a second store was opened in Hoveton. Following the deaths of the founders in the 1950s the business passed to Alfred's children with Fred Roy being appointed chairman and managing director. After his death in 1994, his brother Peter succeeded him as chairman of the board. He served as chairman until his death in 2004, but not before his sons Edward and Paul had joined the board of directors. In 1995, there was a catastrophic fire in the Wroxham Roys branch, costing the firm over 5 million pounds.

Branches
Hoveton
Beccles
Norwich, adjacent to Anglia Square Shopping Centre
Bowthorpe, Norwich
(until 1995) Eaton, Norwich (now Waitrose)
North Walsham
Dereham
Thetford
Sudbury
Bury St. Edmunds

References

External links
Roys of Wroxham

Companies based in Norfolk
Department stores of the United Kingdom
1895 establishments in England
Retail companies established in 1895
British companies established in 1895